, son of Fuyumichi, was kugyo or highest-ranking Japanese court noble of the Muromachi period (1336–1573). Unlike other members of the family he did not hold a regent position kampaku. Regent Fusahira was his son.

References
 https://web.archive.org/web/20070927231943/http://nekhet.ddo.jp/people/japan/fstakatukasa.html

1357 births
1425 deaths
Fujiwara clan
Takatsukasa family